Victory Heights is a rural residential locality in the Gympie Region, Queensland, Australia. In the  Victory Heights had a population of 555 people.

Geography 
Cootharaba Road / Tin Can Bay Road (State Route 15) passes through from south-west to north-east. The North Coast railway line passes through from south to north-west. The Gympie North railway station is in the north-west corner of the locality.

The land use is mostly rural residential with some pockets of grazing on native vegetation.

History
At the  Victory Heights had a population of 394 people.

In the  Victory Heights had a population of 555 people.

Economy
Robertson Brothers Sawmills is at 30 Old Wolvi Road.

Education
There are no schools in Victory Heights. The nearest government primary schools are Gympie West State School in neighbouring Gympie to the west, One Mile State School in neighbouring Gympie to the south-west, and Gympie East State School in Greens Creek to the east. The nearest government secondary school is Gympie State High School in Gympie to the south-west.

References

Gympie Region
Localities in Queensland